The Order of the War Banner ( / ,) was the 7th highest military decoration of the Socialist Federal Republic of Yugoslavia (SFRY), and awarded  to "military commanders who show personal courage, self-sacrifice, involvement in commanding and distinct role in creation, fixing and training of Armed Forces of SFRY during the war".

It was founded by the Presidency of People's Assembly on 29 December 1951. A public competition was announced for its creation. The results of the competition were published in Politika on 27 August 1953, and the winner was Grigorij Samojlov, an architect from Belgrade.

From its establishment in 1951 until 1984, there were 209 recipients of the order; 204 were Yugoslav citizens, and the remaining were Soviet generals (who were awarded in 1964).

It was dissolved on 4 December 1998. After the dissolution of the SFRY, it was also used by the Federal Republic of Yugoslavia (Serbia and Montenegro).

See also
Orders, decorations, and medals of the Socialist Federal Republic of Yugoslavia

Sources
 General Encyclopedia. Yugoslav Lexicographical Institute. Zagreb. 1980. 
 Prister, Boris. Odlikovanja. Povijesni muzej hrvatske. Zagreb. 1984. 

Awards established in 1951
Orders, decorations, and medals of Yugoslavia
1951 establishments in Yugoslavia